The Guelph Biltmore Mad Hatters were a Canadian junior ice hockey team in the Ontario Hockey Association (OHA) from 1940 to 1942, and 1947 to 1960. The team was often known as the "Biltmores" and sponsored by the Guelph Biltmore Hat Company, and played home games at the Guelph Memorial Gardens.

History
The Guelph Biltmore Mad Hatters were a brief note in junior hockey history, but left an impression on the game during 13 years of operation. The team that was sponsored by a local manufacturer in the Royal City would capture a national championship, several provincial titles, and send four men on to the Hockey Hall of Fame.

The team was founded as the Guelph Indians for the 1936-37 season. After four seasons, the Guelph Biltmore Hat Company became the team's sponsors. After two more seasons of play, the team was put on hiatus for World War II. The team was resurrected in 1947 as a farm team for the New York Rangers of the NHL and coached by former Rangers forward Alf Pike until the end of 1954. Eddie Bush, a former NHL defenceman, would take over the coaching duties from 1954 onwards.

The Biltmore Hat Company rewarded any player scoring three or more goals in one game the choice of hats at their factory, bringing new meaning to the term "hat trick."

After running into financial trouble in 1960, new ownership renamed the team the Guelph Royals, after the city's nickname. Three years later the team moved becoming the Kitchener Rangers, taking the name of the parent club from the NHL.

Championships
The Mad Hatters won the Memorial Cup in 1952 as national junior ice hockey champions of Canada, and the George Richardson Memorial Trophy as eastern Canadian champions the same year. Guelph won the J. Ross Robertson Cup three times as OHA champions.

J. Ross Robertson Cup
 1942 Lost to Oshawa Generals
 1950 Defeated Windsor Spitfires
 1952 Defeated St. Catharines Teepees
 1957 Defeated St. Catharines Teepees

Memorial Cup
 1952 Defeated Regina Pats

George Richardson Memorial Trophy
 1950 Lost to Montreal Junior Canadiens
 1952 Defeated Montreal Junior Canadiens
 1957 Lost to Ottawa Junior Canadiens

1952 Memorial Cup
The Guelph Biltmore Mad Hatters played in the best-of-seven series for the Memorial Cup of 1952 versus the Regina Pats, the Abbott Cup champions of Western Canada hailing from Regina, Saskatchewan.

Guelph that year broke the OHA record for single season scoring with 341 goals in a 54-game schedule, which was 34 goals more than the previous mark. Ken Laufman set on OHA record at the time with 139 points. Guelph defeated the Montreal Junior Canadiens in a six-game series for the Eastern Canadian final.

The Mad Hatters won the first game on home ice at the Guelph Memorial Gardens by a score of 8 to 2. The rest of the series would be played at Maple Leaf Gardens in Toronto. Guelph won the next two games 4 to 2 and 8 to 2. The Biltmores completed the series sweep in game four posting a 10 to 2 triumph to win the Memorial Cup.

Players
Four alumni of the Mad Hatters have been inducted into the Hockey Hall of Fame: Andy Bathgate, Rod Gilbert, Harry Howell and Jean Ratelle. Players who also had impressive NHL careers are Dean Prentice and Ron Murphy.

Award winners
Red Tilson TrophyMost Outstanding Player in the OHA
 1955-1956 - Ron Howell

Eddie Powers Memorial TrophyScoring Champion of the OHA
 1951-1952 - Ken Laufman, 139 points
 1956-1957 - Bill Sweeney, 106 points

NHL alumni

 Paul Andrea
 Andy Bathgate
 Frank Bathgate
 Danny Belisle
 William Chalmers
 Wally Clune
 Jim Connelly
 Bob Cunningham
 Herb Dickenson
 Marc Dufour
 Lorne Ferguson
 Lou Fontinato
 Bruce Gamble
 Rod Gilbert
 Gerry Goyer
 Aldo Guidolin
 John Holota
 Harry Howell
 Ron Howell
 Al LeBrun
 Joe Levandoski
 Tony Licari
 Willie Marshall
 Clare Martin
 Shep Mayer
 Bill McCreary, Sr.
 Sandy McGregor
 Roland McLenahan
 Mike McMahon, Jr.
 Hillary Menard
 Ron Murphy
 Bob Plager
 Dean Prentice
Jean Ratelle
 Leo Reise, Jr.
 Doug Robinson
 Leon Rochefort
 Eddie Shack
 Glen Sonmor
 Ron Stewart
 Bill Sweeney
 Gilles Villemure

Yearly results
Played as Guelph Indians, 1936-40.

References

Defunct Ontario Hockey League teams
Sport in Guelph
1940 establishments in Ontario
1960 disestablishments in Ontario
Ice hockey clubs established in 1940
Sports clubs disestablished in 1960